, also known as The Buri Buri 3-minutes Face-Off, is a 2005 anime film. It is the 13th film based on the popular comedy manga and anime series Crayon Shin-chan. The film was released to theatres on April 16, 2005 in Japan.

The film was produced by Shin-Ei Animation, the studio behind the main Crayon Shin-chan anime television. It was later released on DVD in Japan on November 25, 2005.

Plot
One night, a mysterious giant monster appeared in Kasukabe, crushing the Nohara family without a trace. This was all a dream dreamt by  Shinnosuke while holding a soft vinyl monster, Sirimarudashi. After throwing Sirimarudashi, he switches to an action-masked soft vinyl doll and begins to dream another dream. In that dream, Shinnosuke joins forces with the action mask to defeat the monster army and rescue Mimiko, who learns "knowledge of justice" from the action mask.

And in the morning. As usual, Misae cooks breakfast, Hiroshi goes to work, and Shinnosuke goes to kindergarten. However, as usual, Shinnosuke missed the pick-up bus, and Misae decided to send Shinnosuke to kindergarten by bicycle again. Misae, who went home, prepared cup ramen for breakfast, but was tired and just took a nap.

An object that dances in the air while emitting light from the back of the hanging scroll appears there. The illuminant was haunted by the scent of cup ramen and possessed by the Sirimarudashi doll that was lying beside it. However, unfortunately, I was witnessed by Misae Nohara. The object, which is neither binary  nor ternary, explained the situation to Misae Nohara, and said that he was a space-time coordinator, " Miraiman, " who came from the future. Originally, he didn't plan to come to the Nohara family, but Miraiman regrets that it was a big deal because he was so hungry that he lost the temptation of cup ramen and was found even when he came here.

The Nohara family was taken to the world three minutes later by Miraiman through the back of the hanging scroll. It leads to the rooftop of a building near Tokyo Tower, and a cocoon-like thing floated above Tokyo Tower, and monsters were attacking the city. Miraiman tells that monsters are appearing one after another due to the disturbance of space-time, and if you do not go to the future three minutes later and defeat the monsters, the crisis will become a reality, and ask the family for cooperation. In order to exterminate the monsters, the family confronts the monsters with the ability to freely transform with the power of Miraiman and the heart of justice through the doll of Sirimarudashi where Miraiman resides.

However, eventually, even Hiroshi Nohara, who became ecstatic that he was protecting the world, began to devote himself to exterminating monsters and neglecting his daily life, and Shinnosuke took care of the sunflowers on behalf of his parents. become. One morning, the kindergarten teachers who came to pick up Shinnosuke as usual noticed that the Nohara family was strange and tried to hear from Shinnosuke who came to the kindergarten. At that time, there was news that a department store in Kasukabe had partially collapsed and Kazama's mother was involved and injured. At the same time, a dark cloud hangs over Tokyo Tower, and three minutes later, the cocoon of a monster that should be in the world appears. Shinnosuke hurried back to his house and saw Hiroshi and Misae injured there. A powerful monster that could not be defeated appeared within 3 minutes, and the aftermath of the battle caused damage to the present world. Immediately after that, a more powerful monster appears, and even Hiroshi Nohara throws a spoon if he can't help.

Then, Shinnosuke stands up in order to "get Himawari to become a female college student and have her friends introduce her to her wonderfully."

Cast
Akiko Yajima - Shin-chan
Keiji Fujiwara - Hiroshi
Miki Narahashi - Misae
Satomi Kōrogi - Himawari
Kunio Murai - Miraiman

See also
 Crayon Shin-chan
 Yoshito Usui

References

External links
 
 

2005 anime films
Legend Called Buri Buri 3 Minutes Charge
Toho animated films
Films set in Tokyo